This is a list of specific Mongolian autonomous zones in China except Inner Mongolia. Beside Oirat, these include other Mongolic people such as Santa Mongol, Tsagaan Mongol and Bonan Mongol.

Mongol Autonomous zone

Mongol Prefectures 
 Haixi Mongol and Tibetan Autonomous Prefecture (in Qinghai)
 Bayingolin Mongol Autonomous Prefecture (in Xinjiang)
 Bortala Mongol Autonomous Prefecture (in Xinjiang)

Mongol Counties 
 Weichang Manchu and Mongol Autonomous County (in Hebei)
 Harqin Left Mongol Autonomous County (in Liaoning)
 Fuxin Mongol Autonomous County (in Liaoning)
 Qian Gorlos Mongol Autonomous County (in Jilin)
 Dorbod Mongol Autonomous County (in Heilongjiang)
 Subei Mongol Autonomous County (in Gansu)
 Henan Mongol Autonomous County (in Qinghai)
 Hoboksar Mongol Autonomous County (in Xinjiang)
 Dongxiang Autonomous County (in Gansu)
 Jishishan Bonan, Dongxiang and Salar Autonomous County in (in Gansu)
 Sunan Yugur Autonomous County (in Gansu)
 Datong Hui and Tu Autonomous County (in Qinghai)
 Huzhu Tu Autonomous County (in Qinghai) 
 Minhe Hui and Tu Autonomous County (in Gansu)

References 

Autonomous prefectures of the People's Republic of China
Mongol autonomous counties